Carl Edward Hendrix (August 8, 1906 – January 9, 1977) was an American politician. He was a member of the Arkansas House of Representatives, serving from 1945 to 1950. He was a member of the Democratic party.

References

1977 deaths
1906 births
People from Sevier County, Arkansas
20th-century American politicians
Speakers of the Arkansas House of Representatives
Democratic Party members of the Arkansas House of Representatives